Vive (Live) is the title of the studio album released by Mexican singer José José in 1974. The main hits of the album were: Vive, Déjame Conocerte (Paul Anka's "Let Me Get To Know You") and Tú Mi Delirio.

Track listing
 Cada Mañana
 Y Nada Más
 Es Que Te Quiero
 Tú Eres Todo Para Mí (You Are The Sunshine Of My Life)
 Alguien Que Te Extraña
 Estábamos Juntos
 Vive
 Déjame Conocerte (Paul Anka's "Let Me Get To Know You")
 Tú Mi Delirio
 Y Háblame
 Cuando El Amor Se Va De Casa (Cuando O Amor Cambia De Casa)

1974 albums
José José albums
Spanish-language albums